Pak Suzuki Motor Company Limited (PSMCL) is a Pakistani automobile company which is a subsidiary of Japanese automaker Suzuki. 

It is the Pakistani assembler and distributor of cars manufactured by Suzuki and its subsidiaries and foreign divisions. Currently Pak Suzuki is the largest car assembler in Pakistan.

History 

The firm was founded in September 1982 as a joint venture between the Government of Pakistan and Suzuki Motor Japan, formalizing the arrangement by which Awami Auto Ltd. had produced the Suzuki SS80 from 1982. Suzuki originally owned 25% of the stock, and have gradually increased their holding; they now own 73.09%. Pak-Suzuki was a joint venture between the semi-governmental Pakistan Automobile Corporation (PACO), who had earlier overseen local assembly from kits. Pak Suzuki is the market leader in Pakistan Automobile Market by having more than 60% (as of December 2011) of market share. Lacking serious competition, Pak Suzuki has had a market share of more than 50% since its inception and has complete monopoly in the small car segment. Apart from giving automobile related services like Suzuki Finance and Suzuki Insurance, Pak Suzuki also deals in Pak Suzuki Certified Used Cars.

Having assembled both the Carry and Jimny locally since 1976, Suzuki's first locally built product was the 800 cc ST90 Carry van and truck. 25,000 per year was the beginning production. By 1984 the 1000 cc Jimny (SJ410) and 800 cc Alto/Fronte (called "FX") had been added to the lineup, and a second plant was planned for 1985. Cars built by Suzuki Pakistan often lack essential features which are standard in other cars, such as airbags, rear windshield defogger and rear seat belts. In 2006, Pak Suzuki offered factory-fitted CNG two years after rival Dewan Motors started offering the facility in their locally assembled Hyundai Santros.

By 2012, the Pakistani-assembled Suzuki Mehran remained possibly the last car in the world which still used a carbureted engine, but from the end of 2012 Suzuki Mehrans have been equipped with EFI engines to meet the old Euro-II emission standards. The Suzuki Mehran was finally discontinued in March 2019. As a joint venture, Pak Suzuki is also investing in an automobile glass manufacturing company.

The company experienced huge decrease in sales in July 2022, causing loss of 1.52 billion rupees.

Current Vehicles
As of 2018, Pak Suzuki Motors produces over 150,000 cars and light commercial vehicles.

Suzuki Alto (Eighth generation - HA36S/V) 

In 2019, Suzuki launched the Eighth Generation of Alto (660cc) in 3 different variants.
 Suzuki Alto VX
 Suzuki Alto VXR
 Suzuki Alto VXL

Suzuki Bolan 

The Suzuki Bolan is only offered in manual transmission.

Suzuki Cultus (Celerio)

A second generation of the Cultus was launched in Pakistan in 2017 after replacing the first generation Cultus. The new Cultus is a second generation and a rebadged version of Suzuki Celerio which was launched in 2014.
Suzuki Cultus VXR
Suzuki Cultus VXL

Suzuki Ravi 

The pickup version of the Suzuki Bolan. It was sold only in manual transmission.

Suzuki Wagon R 

Pak Suzuki launched the new Wagon R in April 2014, using the chassis code A1J310. It was offered in three variants – VX, VXR and VXL – in 6 body colours. The Wagon R gets the 998 cc K10B three-cylinder Euro 2 compliant engine that develops 67 hp at 6,200 rpm and 90 Nm at 3,500 rpm. It is paired to a 5-speed manual transmission.

Suzuki Swift 

Pak Suzuki launched the first generation of Swift in 2010 when this generation was being globally retired.The first generation of Suzuki Swift continued to be assembled in Pakistan till August 2021.

3rd-generation Swift model was launched in Pakistan on 24 February 2022 by Pak Suzuki Motor Company. The GLX-CVT version is equipped with push-start button, cruise-control, LED headlamps with embedded DRLs (daytime running lamp), 16-inch alloy wheels, six airbags, rear parking sensor, and a rear-view camera.

Former Vehicles

Suzuki Alto (Fifth generation - HA12) 

Produced between 2000-2008. Although the Pakistani assembly of the Alto has stopped as of June 16, 2012, if retailers wish to sell it they could purchase it from Suzuki's other affiliates such as Suzuki in Japan, though it would be more expensive. In 2019, Suzuki launched the 660cc Alto Eighth generation (HA36S/V) in 3 different variants.

Suzuki Baleno 

The SY413 Baleno (also known as the Cultus Crescent and Esteem in other countries) was assembled in Pakistan starting 1998 as a replacement of Suzuki Margalla, till 2006 when it was replaced by the Liana. When introduced, it featured a number of improvements over Margalla, such standard power steering, wider tyres (175/70R13 vs 155/80R13), tachometer as standard, 4-spoke steering wheel vs. 2-spoke steering wheel of Margalla, black interior vs grey interior, EFi vs carburettor and 16-valve vs 8-valve. It featured the G13BB engine, though on the chassis plate throughout the entire run it was stamped as G13B. Initial trim levels included GL, GXi, Gli and GliP (also known as Gli Plus). Baleno featured highly advanced technology at its time, as it was the first one to offer distributorless EFi.

Suzuki Cultus 

Produced between 2000-2017. Suzuki Cultus was launched in 2000 as a successor to the popular Suzuki Khyber. It is a basic version of globally obsolete Suzuki Cultus Generation 2 as produced in Hungary from 1992 to 2003, with a carburetted 993 cc G10 three-cylinder engine. From 2003 up to 2010 CNG kit was offered as a factory-fitted option. In August 2008, the engine was upgraded to a 4-cylinder 993 cc G10B EFi engine. The EFi was not distributorless and a camshaft-driven electronic distributor was utilized for spark generation. The new engine provided better fuel economy, power delivery and acceleration.

Suzuki FX 

Produced between 1982-1988. A modified version of the Suzuki Alto SS40 manufactured under the chassis code SS80, with a 796 cc F8B engine. Early models came with black interior, later changed to beige interior improving the aesthetics by making it appear spacious. Later models remained popular for this reason. A/C was available as an option in some years.
Production was discontinued and Suzuki Mehran was launched as a replacement in 1989.

Suzuki Khyber
Production closed down in 2000, replaced with the Suzuki Cultus.. .. ..

Suzuki Kizashi 

The Suzuki Kizashi was introduced in Pakistan in 2015 and discontinued in 2016.

Suzuki Liana 

The Suzuki Liana sedan, originally with 1.6-litre engines, replaced the Baleno.

Suzuki Margalla 

The sedan shape of Suzuki Cultus second generation was initially (1990) imported from Japan to test the market and sold under the name Suzuki Sedan (possibly because it was the first sedan body style offering by Pak Suzuki Motors). It bore a chassis code SF310 and came with a carburetted 3-cylinder 993 cc G10 engine. The market reception was good though the audience complained of low power. The same car was considered for local manufacture as an entry level executive car. Manufacture started 1992 under the name Suzuki Margalla, chassis code SF413 using an 8-valve SOHC 4-cylinder G13 carburetted engine. It came with power steering as an option. Tachometer was not available in any of the variants. The car was offered in variants such GL and GLX, with an upgrade variant called Margalla Plus launched later on. Production was ceased in 1998 to give way to the replacement Suzuki Baleno. In the Pakistani used car market, "Suzuki Sedan" refers to the 1000 cc import model, whereas Suzuki Margalla means the locally assembled 1300 cc model.

Suzuki Mehran 

Suzuki Mehran began production in 1988 as the "Alto", but was renamed Mehran in 1992. The name stems from an old Iranian name, meaning "child of the sun." The Mehran received minor facelifts in 1998 and again in 2004. The Mehran was available in VX or VXR equipment levels. It had again received a mild facelift with an asymmetric grille at the same time with the introduction of the EFi engine in 2012. Production ended in 2019.
Suzuki Mehran VX
Suzuki Mehran VXR

Suzuki Potohar 

The Suzuki Samurai as produced by Spain's Santana Motors from 1985 to 2003 with an international 1982-1984 Suzuki F10A 970 cc carburetor engine. Pak Suzuki Motors manufactured it under the name Suzuki Potohar using the chassis code SJ410. The fuel ignition system was legacy distributor with breaker points. A common after-market upgrade was to replace the stock distributor with the one that came with the locally manufactured Suzuki Alto. Only SWB versions were offered. Initial models came with 4-wheel drum brakes though later it was upgraded with front-wheel disc brakes as standard. Factory-fitted CNG was offered in some years as well. Potohar was popular due to high ground clearance, low-end torque, capable 4x4, low fuel consumption and easy maintenance. In 2006, Potohar was discontinued with no locally manufactured replacement. Rather Suzuki Jimny with M13A engine was offered as an import model at nearly twice the cost.

Motorcycles
As of 2018, Suzuki motorcycles plant produces approximately 44,000 units annually.

Suzuki GD-110S 
GD 110 110cc bike with EURO 2 engine technology with electric start system.
Currently being imported from China in CKD form.
Fuel average is 44 km/L 
Price Rs 207,000 as of 2022 Self starter 
(Deluxe Model of GD-110) Self Start and Alloy RIM. This is basic difference between GD110 and GD110S having Sporty headlights surrounded by fairing and considered one of the best daily commute bike in Pakistan.

Suzuki GS-150 
GS 150 150cc Bike
Most powerful engined bike manufactured locally with electric start system. It is one of the most selling bike in Pakistan.

Suzuki GR-150 
Started production in 2018

Suzuki GSX-125

Discontinued motorcycles

Suzuki Sprinter ECO
110cc Basic features bike with EURO 2 engine technology.

Suzuki Sprinter Standard
Upgrade model of Sprinter ECO.

Suzuki Raider
Raider 110cc bike with EURO 2 engine technology.
Production started in the 4th Quarter of 2012.

Suzuki GS 150 SE
150cc with japanese star shrunken supreme alloy wheels. Non 
Efi, no engine balancer. Only category cruiser tourer motorbike sold in Pakistan.

Gallery

See also 
 Automotive industry in Pakistan

References

External links 
 Pak Suzuki Cars

Suzuki
Car manufacturers of Pakistan
Motorcycle manufacturers of Pakistan
Manufacturing companies based in Karachi
Vehicle manufacturing companies established in 1983
Companies listed on the Pakistan Stock Exchange
Japan–Pakistan relations
Pakistani subsidiaries of foreign companies
Formerly government-owned companies of Pakistan
Pakistani companies established in 1983